KLAA-FM (103.5 MHz) is a country music radio station broadcasting in the Alexandria, Louisiana, radio market. The station is licensed to the hamlet of Tioga, Louisiana, which is located northeast of Alexandria in Rapides Parish. It is branded as Louisiana's 10 In A Row Country with the slogan of "LA 103.5" and is owned by Stephens Media Group, through SMG-Alexandria, LLC.  Its studios are located in Pineville and its transmitter is in Ball, Louisiana.

References

External links 
 
 

Radio stations in Louisiana
Country radio stations in the United States
Radio stations established in 1984
1984 establishments in Louisiana